Zaporizhzhia Governorate was a territorial division or gubernia of the Ukrainian SSR (Ukraine) that was created in April 1920. The new governorate was temporarily established in place of the Tavria Okruha.

Soon after the Ukrainian SSR joined the Soviet Union, the governorate was merged into the Yekaterinoslav Governorate.

Subdivisions
 Berdiansk County
 Henichesk County
 Huliaipole County
 Velykyi Tokmak County
 Oleksandrivsk County

 
Governorates of Ukraine
History of Zaporizhzhia Oblast